Quja Beyglu (also Romanized as Qūjā Beyglū) is a village in Savalan Rural District, in the Central District of Parsabad County, Ardabil Province, Iran. At the 2006 census, its population was 340, in 61 families.

References 

Towns and villages in Parsabad County